Streptomyces purpureus is a bacterium species from the genus of Streptomyces which has been isolated from soil. Streptomyces purpureus produces chloramphenicol, bottromycin and fradicin.

See also 
 List of Streptomyces species

References

Further reading

External links
Type strain of Streptomyces purpureus at BacDive -  the Bacterial Diversity Metadatabase	

purpureus
Bacteria described in 1986